Kazuhiro Takami (born 11 December 1959) is a Japanese professional golfer.

Takami played on the Japan Golf Tour, winning twice.

Professional wins (4)

Japan Golf Tour wins (2)

Japan Golf Tour playoff record (1–1)

Japan PGA Senior Tour wins (2)
2010 Fancl Classic
2012 Fancl Classic

Results in major championships

CUT = missed the half-way cut
Note: Takami only played in The Open Championship.

Team appearances
Dunhill Cup (representing Japan): 1996

External links

Japanese male golfers
Japan Golf Tour golfers
Sportspeople from Hokkaido
1959 births
Living people